Lucy Clare Davis (born 17 February) is an English actress best known for playing Dawn Tinsley in the BBC comedy The Office (2001–2003). 
She is also known for her roles as Hilda Spellman in the Netflix series The Chilling Adventures of Sabrina (2018–2020), Dianne in the horror-comedy Shaun of the Dead (2004), and Etta Candy in Wonder Woman (2017). She is also currently playing the role of Eva in Disney Channel's action comedy series The Villains of Valley View, which premiered on June 3, 2022.

Career
Davis appeared briefly in an episode of The Detectives, a show created for and starring her father (Jasper Carrott). She played Maria Lucas in the BBC's 1995 production of Pride and Prejudice, and also had a role in the 1996 Christmas special of One Foot in the Grave. After her breakthrough role as Dawn Tinsley in The Office, Davis appeared in the films Sex Lives of the Potato Men and Shaun of the Dead in 2004, whilst continuing to play Hayley Jordan in The Archers on BBC Radio 4. She gave up this last role when her other acting responsibilities made it impossible to continue, and the part was recast in September 2005.

Davis appeared in the third-season episode "Elephants and Hens" of UK TV programme Black Books. In 2006, Davis appeared as the "Fashion TV" host on ABC's Ugly Betty, and later that year played writer Lucy Kenwright in NBC's Studio 60 on the Sunset Strip. In 2008, she appeared in several episodes of the US series Reaper. In 2010, Davis starred in ITV's six-episode comedy drama, Married Single Other, and also appeared in a guest role in The Mentalist alongside her then-husband Owain Yeoman. Davis also appears in the John Landis-produced thriller Some Guy Who Kills People. In 2012, Davis had a guest voice part in Family Guy for the episode "Be Careful What You Fish For". Davis appeared in series two, episode eight of the BBC series Death in Paradise (2013). She became a Patron for the performing arts group Theatretrain in 2012.

Davis plays the role of Etta Candy in the 2017 film Wonder Woman. Her performance marked the first live action cinematic portrayal of that comic book character. Davis has said of the character: "She's a woman in a man's world and so being heard and seen aren't the easiest things, but it kind of doesn't deter her. Etta is unapologetically herself and I think that that's the thing that has drawn me to her the most... it took quite a while in my life to be unapologetically myself."

Davis appeared in the Netflix series The Chilling Adventures of Sabrina as Hilda Spellman, which aired from 2018 to 2020. She is starring as Eva, known as the supervillain Surge, on the Disney Channel sitcom The Villains of Valley View  which premiered June 3, 2022.

Personal life
Davis is the daughter of Hazel Jackson and comedian Robert Davis, better known as Jasper Carrott. In December 1997, Davis underwent a kidney transplant after being diagnosed with kidney failure during a medical examination. Her mother donated the kidney. Around Christmas 2005 she was hospitalised once again because of kidney failure, but later recovered. Davis also has type 1 diabetes.

On 9 December 2006, Davis married Welsh actor Owain Yeoman at St Paul's Cathedral, London. The wedding was attended by fellow The Office cast members and writers. Davis was entitled to marry there as her father is an Officer of the Order of the British Empire (OBE) and St Paul's contains the chapel of the order. The couple separated in January 2011 and divorced in October 2011.

In 2007, Davis posed nude in the People for the Ethical Treatment of Animals's campaign against the Guards Division's continued use of traditional bearskin caps.

Filmography

Film

Television

Radio

References

External links
 
 

Year of birth missing (living people)
Living people
English radio actresses
English soap opera actresses
English stage actresses
English television actresses
English voice actresses
English expatriates in the United States
People from Solihull
People educated at King Edward VI High School for Girls, Birmingham
Kidney transplant recipients
20th-century English actresses
21st-century English actresses
Actresses from the West Midlands (county)
English film actresses